Palayamkottai is an assembly constituency located in Tirunelveli district in Tamil Nadu. It falls under Tirunelveli Lok Sabha Constituency. It is one of the 234 State Legislative Assembly Constituencies in Tamil Nadu, in India.

Tamil Nadu

Election Results

2021

2016

2011

2006

2001

1996

1991

1989

1984

1980

1977

References 

 

Assembly constituencies of Tamil Nadu
Tirunelveli district